Bonnie's Kitchen 2 is Bonnie Pink's second greatest hits album released under the Pony Canyon label on January 19, 2000.

Track listing
Evil & Flowers (Piano Version) (from Evil & Flowers)
Forget Me Not (from Evil & Flowers)
Hickey Hickey (from Evil & Flowers)
Silence (from Heaven's Kitchen)
Friends, Aren't We? (Non-album song)
Only for Him (from Evil & Flowers)
Melody (from Heaven's Kitchen)
Quiet Life (from Evil & Flowers)
Meddler (from Evil & Flowers)
Mad Afternoon (from Heaven's Kitchen)
Get in My Hair (from Heaven's Kitchen)
The Last Thing I Can Do (Non-album song)
Blackbird (Previously Unreleased)
Bonus Track: We've Gotta Find a Way Back to Love (Non-album song)

Bonnie Pink albums
2000 compilation albums
Pony Canyon compilation albums